Science and Technology is one of the main field of the state policy that generally affects all aspects in Azerbaijan. Azerbaijan National Academy of Sciences (ANAS) is considered as the central agency for science and technology in order to implement state policy in this field.

Science policy 
Main priorities of the scientific policy are provision of sustainable improvement actions in science and technology, maintenance of scientific and technological potential, preparation of highly qualified human resources in science and technology and increasing labor value of the scientific workers. A number of measures are defined in order to increase the efficiency of scientific activity of ANAS, building interrelated relations between universities and scientific institutions, ensuring the application of results of the scientific researches in socio-economic and other spheres in the country and properly use of scientific personnel. A development strategy for science and technology in Azerbaijan has been prepared by the Presidium of ANAS. The strategy covers issues relating to the expanding role of science and technology in the solution of socio-economic problems, strengthening innovation processes and increasing information resources of the state.

Main targets of the scientific strategy 

 Defining the structure and content of the science in Azerbaijan with regard to current and priority demands of the country
 Ensuring scientific improvements in accordance with the experience of world science and technology 
 Increasing the role of science in the development of economy in the country
 Provision of trainings for scientific workers in order to increase potential of the human resources in the field of science and specialists deal with scientific problems
 Relating to the solution of socio-economic and socio-cultural issues defining priorities of scientific researches  
 Expanding researches in fundamental sciences
 Improving management system in the field of science and technology
 Improving scientific finance mechanisms in the scientific research institutions
 Modernization of infrastructure in science and technology and creation of legal-scientific base
 Preservation of scientific institutions and schools
 Providing integration of science education and production
 Improvement of social condition of the scientific workers
 Strengthening the provision of the scientific information
 Expanding international scientific relations and acceleration of integration of Azerbaijani science into the international science

Trends in science funding 
Statistics reveal that Azerbaijan spent 0.2% of its gross domestic product (GDP) on science development in 2016. Since 2000 this trend has been stable. Azerbaijan’s share of scientific researches was 0.3% of GDP in 2000 and 2009. The share of expenditure on research in gross domestic product has decreased since 2009 to 0.2% of GDP (2016). Azerbaijan was ranked 80th in the Global Innovation Index in 2021, up from 84th in 2019.

Scientific institutions and organizations 

Azerbaijan has more than 35 scientific institutions that provide scientific investigations in the fields of social sciences, humanitarian sciences, medical-biological sciences, chemical sciences, earth sciences and technical sciences etc. Institution of Information Technology, Institute of Radiation problems, Astrophysical Observatory named after Nasreddin Tusi, Institute of Control Systems, Institute of Mathematics and Mechanics and Institute of Physics provide researches in the field of Physics, Mathematics and Technical Sciences. İnstitute of Catalyse and Inorganic Chemistry, Institute of Polymer materials, Institute of Petrochemical Processes and Institute of Chemical Additives acts under the Department of Chemical Sciences. Other scientific institutions include the Institute of Geography, Institute of Geology and Geophysics, Institute of Oil and Gas, which generate scientific researches under the Department of Earth Sciences. Besides, 10 institutions function under the Department of Biological and Medical Sciences such as, Genetic Resources Institute, Institute of Dendrology, Institute of Erosion and Irrigation, Institute of Soil Science and Agricultural Chemistry, Institute of Microbiology, Institute of Physiology, institute of Botany, Central Botanical Garden, institute of Zoology, Institute of Molecular Biology and Biotechnology. Overall 15 institutions operate under the Department of Social and Humanitarian Sciences. Main of them are included Institute of Folklore, Institute of Architecture and Art, Institute of Literature named after Nizami Ganjavi, Institute of Linguistics named after Nasimi, Institute of Manuscripts named after Muhammed Fuzuli, Institute of Philosophy, Institute of Economics, Institute of History of Science and Institute of Archelogy and Ethnography.

Science Development Foundation 

Foundation was established in accordance with the presidential decree dated 2009 . The main directions of the foundation are maintenance of the scientific-technological potential in the country and application of this potential in the development of the economy, expanding the role of the science and technology in the solution of social problems and financing scientific investigations, programs, projects and other scientific events. Consequently, Scientific Development Foundation provides financial support for implementation of state’s scientific strategy.

Grassroots initiatives for tech start-ups, 2015–2019 
There are numerous grassroots initiatives promoting tech-based start-ups and the institutions that can support them, such as technology parks.

Yeni Fikir (New Idea) is a start-up competition backed by the Baku Engineering University and sponsored by British Petroleum; since 2016, it has secured support for 100 projects and provided 35 of these with incubation services. Initiatives supported by the Korea International Development Agency, such as the Smart Bridge or the Promotion of Digital Government, are striving to enhance technology transfer, university–business collaboration and the capacity to survey e-governance needs; Smart Bridge provided 60 academics and business representatives with two weeks of training in August 2019, for instance.

The principal issue with initiatives such as these, in addition to the limited impact conferred by their modest scope, is that their focus on promoting technology uptake grabs attention, even as activity generating science and innovation directly remains limited.

High Technologies Park of ANAS 
High Technologies Park of Azerbaijan National Academy of Sciences was created in accordance with the presidential decree dated November 8, 2016 . The main objectives of the High-Tech Park are establishment of application mechanisms of the industry-driven projects, provision of technical innovation for mass production and enabling practical works in the field of science and technology.

Notable scientists 

Several scientists from Azerbaijan including Lotfi A. Zadeh in fuzzy set theory made significant contributions to both the local and international science community. Other notable Azerbaijani scientists include Nazim Muradov, Azad Mirzajanzade, Yusif Mammadaliyev, Lev Landau, Garib Murshudov, Kalil Kalantar, Alikram Aliyev, Masud Afandiyev etc.

Scientific publications 
There are more than 20 periodically published scientific journals including “Problems of Information Technologies”, “Problems of the Information Society” scientific-practical journals and transactions of the Azerbaijan National Academy of Sciences in various fields of science.

Furthermore, there are a number of scientific magazines including 2 international magazines function under the Ministry of Education of Azerbaijan. The most of these magazines are published in the universities. 4 magazines are considered as a joint science magazines including scientific-technical and industrial magazine “Ecology and Water Industry”, which is jointly published by AACU, ASRHE and Science-Production Association, Water Canal Scientific-research and Project Institute and Environment and Water Industry Scientific Research Institute.

AMEA 

The National Academy of Sciences of Azerbaijan is the main science association of the country. It was founded in 1945 as a branch of USSR Academy of Sciences.

Before 1945, Azerbaijani branch of USSR Academy of Science was named Society of investigation and study of Azerbaijan as a forerunner of Azerbaijan branch of USSR academy of science. Back then, the full Azerbaijani atlas with the geological map was published in three volumes.

In 1995, the National Academy of Sciences of Azerbaijan established a university network covering the main scientific institutions and organizations of the state structure in Azerbaijan.

In 2001, Academy of sciences gained the status of “National Academy of Science” by presidential decree.

Source 
This article incorporates text from a free content work. Licensed under CC BY-SA 3.0 IGO Text taken from UNESCO Science Report: the Race Against Time for Smarter Development, UNESCO, UNESCO publishing. To learn how to add open license text to Wikipedia articles, please see this how-to page. For information on reusing text from Wikipedia, please see the terms of use.

References 

 
Education in Azerbaijan